Stefano Celozzi (born 2 November 1988) is a German former professional footballer who played as a right-back. Having represented Germany at youth level, he is of Italian descent.

Club career

Youth
After playing youth football with a succession of local clubs, including SSV Ulm 1846, Celozzi joined the youth setup of Bayern Munich in 2005. He quickly progressed to the reserve team, making his debut in the Regionalliga in August 2005, aged just 16. Over the next three seasons, Celozzi played 81 games at this level, scoring three times. He was named as part of the first-team squad for the 2007–08 season, but did not make an appearance, continuing to be a regular for the reserves.

Karlsruher SC
In July 2008, Celozzi joined Karlsruher SC, and made his first appearance on 10 August 2008 in the first round of the DFB-Pokal, against SpVgg Ansbach. He made his Bundesliga debut on 16 August 2008 in the opening fixture against VfL Bochum. Karlsruhe were relegated at the end of the season.

VfB Stuttgart
Following Karlsruhe's relegation, Celozzi moved to VfB Stuttgart in June 2009.

On 3 May 2012, VfB Stuttgart announced that the expiring contract of Celozzi would not be extended.

Eintracht Frankfurt
On 7 May 2012, Eintracht Frankfurt announced that they had signed Celozzi on a two-year contract, starting from the 2012–13 Bundesliga season.

VfL Bochum
On 14 July 2014, Bochum announced that they had signed Celozzi on a two-year contract, starting from the 2014–15 2. Bundesliga season.

Celozzi retired from football in June 2020.

Career statistics

1.Includes Champions League and Europa League.

International career
Celozzi has played for Germany at U-16 and U-18 levels, and since the beginning of the 2009–10 season has been part of the U-21 squad, winning three caps to date.

References

External links
 

1988 births
Living people
People from Günzburg
Sportspeople from Swabia (Bavaria)
German people of Italian descent
Eintracht Frankfurt players
FC Bayern Munich II players
Karlsruher SC players
Karlsruher SC II players
VfB Stuttgart players
VfB Stuttgart II players
VfL Bochum players
German footballers
Association football fullbacks
Bundesliga players
3. Liga players
Germany under-21 international footballers
2. Bundesliga players
Regionalliga players
Footballers from Bavaria